Borkowo Wielkie refers to the following places in Poland:

 Borkowo Wielkie, Masovian Voivodeship
 Borkowo Wielkie, West Pomeranian Voivodeship